The PH Artichoke pendant is a Light fixture designed by Danish architect and designer Poul Henningsen.

It was manufactured by Louis Poulsen. It was created for the Langelinie Pavilion in Copenhagen in 1958.

Design
A chrome inner diffuser also assists in the proper even reflection of the light source. The light source can be an incandescent bulb (high powered halogen or xenon), fluorescent (with the ballast mounted in fixture canopy), or metal halide (canopy-mounted ballast). The metal halide sources are used in the largest of the Artichoke fixtures.  For years, a number of companies have tried to replicate the Artichoke fixture; only a handful have made a replica that is at all geometrically and cosmetically similar.

The Poulsen Artichoke Pendant comes in copper, wet painted white or brushed stainless steel and in three different sizes. The leaves are laser-cut steel to produce shape lines reflective of modern design. The entire fixture is mounted by stainless steel aircraft cables to hold the unusually heavy weight of the light. A heavy duty UL Listed junction box is generally required to handle the weight of this pendant. The metal halide–sourced version utilizes a 220-277 volt AC power input, generally requiring a dedicated 20 A circuit and breaker.

Name 

The English name is PH Artichoke (artichoke). The original Danish name is PH Kogle (conifer cone)  This name is also used in Norway and Germany /PH Kogle/PH Zapfen.

See also
PH-lamp

References

External links 
 PH Artichoke 

Poul Henningsen
Light fixtures
Lighting brands
Danish furniture